Meißen is an electoral constituency (German: Wahlkreis) represented in the Bundestag. It elects one member via first-past-the-post voting. Under the current constituency numbering system, it is designated as constituency 155. It is located in central Saxony, comprising the Meißen district.

Meißen was created for the 2009 federal election. Since 2021, it has been represented by Barbara Lenk of the Alternative for Germany (AfD).

Geography
Meißen is located in central Saxony. As of the 2021 federal election, it is coterminous with the Meißen district.

History
Meißen was created in 2009 and contained parts of the abolished constituencies of Delitzsch – Torgau-Oschatz – Riesa, Kamenz – Hoyerswerda – Großenhain, Dresden II – Meißen I, and Döbeln – Mittweida – Meißen II. In the 2009 election, it was constituency 156 in the numbering system. Since 2013, it has been number 155. Its borders have not changed since its creation.

Members
The constituency was represented by Thomas de Maizière of the Christian Democratic Union (CDU) from 2009 to 2021. It was won by Barbara Lenk of the Alternative for Germany (AfD) in 2021.

Election results

2021 election

2017 election

2013 election

2009 election

References

Federal electoral districts in Saxony
2009 establishments in Germany
Constituencies established in 2009
Meissen (district)